National Route 451 is a national highway of Japan connecting Rumoi, Hokkaido and Takikawa, Hokkaido in Japan, with a total length of 116.5 km (72.39 mi).

References

National highways in Japan
Roads in Hokkaido